Next Left Notes (NLN) is an independent radical publication and weblog connected to the 2006 re-incarnation of Students for a Democratic Society (SDS). NLN began producing print versions in March 2008 - to mark its 4th anniversary.

Founding and new SDS
Next Left Notes was founded in March, 2004, by Thomas Good, its current editor.
Good and other NLN contributors were one source of the refoundation statement of SDS in January 2006.

Next Left Notes differs from New Left Notes, the publication of SDS in the 1960s from which it takes its name, in that it is not officially connected with SDS - although Good and other members of the NLN "collective" are members of Movement for a Democratic Society (MDS), the non-student entity that emerged from SDS at the National Convention in Chicago, Illinois in 2006.

Contributors have included 1960s SDS veterans
(Bernardine Dohrn, Bill Ayers, Paul Buhle, Mark Rudd) and
young people who are involved in the new SDS (Allison Van Doren, Brendan Dunn, Brian Kelly, Pat Korte) and members of pacifist (Frida Berrigan, David McReynolds) and labor activist groups (Penny Rosemont of Charles H. Kerr, various members of the Industrial Workers of the World).

Publication and ideology
According to Next Left Notes, their role in the movement is to cover the New Left actions, conferences and other aspects of the struggle. They provide news articles on left wing events in the United States, as well as commentary and photographic galleries.

Like the 1960s magazine New Left Notes, the publication's contributors and readers are largely New Left and anti-authoritarian. The articles written for NLN support participatory democracy and direct action. The original New Left Notes motto, "Let the People Decide", appears on the NLN masthead.

Criticism
Some writers outside the new SDS have criticized Good and NLN as "militant", "sectarian" and too close to former members of the Weather Underground.

Format
NLN has published as both a web based news site and, since March 2008, as a print publication.  Its content, along with an increasing amount of video and photographic work, is largely released under the GNU General Public License.

See also
Port Militarization Resistance
March 17, 2007 anti-war protest
Brian Flanagan
Jeff Jones (activist)

References

External links
 
 newsds.org: Next Left Notes.

Magazines established in 2004
Alternative magazines
Political magazines published in the United States
New Left
Magazines published in New York City